The 1971 Campeonato Argentino de Rugby   was won by the selection of Unión de Rugby de Buenos Aires that beat in the final the selection of Unión de Rugby de Rosario

History 
THere were two tours in 1971: Argentina visited South Africa in tour, playing against the "Gazelles", the South African Under-23. (see 1971 Argentina rugby union tour of South Africa).

1971 saw the selection of Oxford & Cambridge visited Argentina (1971 Oxford-Cambridge rugby union tour of Argentina). As usual, Argentina won South American Rugby Championship (1971 South American Rugby Championship). The Buenos Aires Champsionship was won by San Isidro Club, the Cordoba Province Championship was won by Tala, and the North-East Championship was won by Universitario Tucuman.

Preliminaries 

,

Semifinals 
 '''Scory system: try = 3 points, conversion=2 point, penalty kick, and kick from mark=3 points. Drop = 3 points. 

 Mar del Plata: L. Rodríguez,  D. Filippa, F. Uriaguereca, C. Sosa (cap), G. Severino,  R. Lerario, R. Caparelli,  E. Feullasier, M. Riego, C. Etchegaray,  W. Heath, D. Cordasco, R. Sepe, F. Rossi, R. Bonomo. 
Buenos Aires:' M. Alonso,  N. Pérez, M. Pascual, A. Travaglini, M. Walther,  A. Etchegaray, R. Matarazzo,  N. Carbone, J. Wittman, H. Silva,  A. Otaño, A. Anthony,  O. Carbone, J. Dumas, L. García Yáñez

 Mendoza: J. Castro,  M. Brandi, R. Tarquini, O. Terranova, E. Candia,  C. Navesi, L. Chacón,  J. Navesi, E. Casale, J. Nasazzi,  A. Cataneo, E. Sánchez,  C.  González,  l. Ramos, R. Irañeta. 
Rosario :'J. Seaton,  G. Blanco, A. Fosse, C. Blanco, C. García,  J. Scilabra, S. Furno,  M. Bouza, J. Fradua, R. Fariello

Third place final 

 Cuyo: E. Naviera,  M. Brandi, E. Gandía, D. Muñiz, C. Dora,  C. Navesi (cap), L. Chacón,  R. Irañeta, L. Ramos, C. González,  C. Schmidt, E. Sánchez,  A. Granata, J. Nasazzi, J. Navesi
Mar del Plata: J. Viders,  L. Rodríguez, C. Sosa (cap), F. Uriaguereca, G. Severino,  R. Lerario, R. Caparelli,  E. Feullasier, M. Riego, C. Etchegaray,  W. Heath, D. Cordasco,  R. Bonomo, F. Rossi, R. Sepe.

Final 

 Buenos Aires: M. Alonso,  N. Pérez, A. Travaglini, M. Pascual, M. Walther,  R. Matarazzo, A. Etchegaray,  N. Carbone, J. Wittman, H. Silva (cap),  A. Otaño, A. Anthony,  O. Carbone, J. Dumas, L. García Yáñez 
Rosario:'J. Seaton,  C. García, A. Fasce, C. Blanco, G. Blanco,  J. Scilabra, M. Escalante,  J. Imhoff, M. Chesta (cap), V. Macat,  M. Senatore, R. Suárez,  S. Furno, J. Fradua, R. Fariello

Bibliography 
  Memorias de la UAR 1971
  XXVII Campeonato Argentino

Campeonato Argentino de Rugby
Argentina
Campeonato